This is a list of school districts in Maine.

Public school systems in Maine are in several types of school administrative units:  Cities which have their own School Departments, also known as cities with individual supervision; School Administrative Districts (S.A.D.s) typically made up of 2 or more cities who cooperatively provide education to all of their students; Regional School Units; Community School Districts (C.S.D.s) in which 2 or more cities cooperate to provide education to some or sometimes all grade levels, Unions of Towns, in which two or more school administrative units share a common superintendent but are otherwise separate, and, in unorganized townships, also known as unorganized territory, schools which are run directly by the state.

The 3 Indian reservation school systems function as a union of towns.

School Departments

School Departments serve a single town or city.  Some school systems may style themselves as a "school district," others as a "school department."

A–C

Acton School Department
Alexander School Department
Andover School Department
Appleton School Department
Athens School Department
Auburn School Department
Augusta School Department
Baileyville School Department
Bangor School Department
Bar Harbor School Department
Baring Plantation School Department
Beals School Department
Beaver Cove School Department
Beddington School Department
Biddeford School Department
Blue Hill School Department
Bowerbank School Department
Bremen School Department
Brewer School Department
Bridgewater School Department
Brighton Plantation School Department
Bristol School Department
Brooklin School Department
Brooksville School Department
Brunswick School Department
Burlington School Department
Byron School Department
Calais School Department
Cape Elizabeth School Department
Caratunk School Department
Carrabassett Valley School Department
Carroll Plantation School Department
Castine School Department
Caswell School Department
Charlotte School Department
Chebeague Island School Department
Cherryfield School Department
Cooper School Department
Coplin Plantation School Department
Cranberry Isles School Department
Crawford School Department
Cutler School Department

D–H

Damariscotta School Department
Dayton School Department
Deblois School Department
Dedham School Department
Dennistown Plantation School Department
Dennysville School Department
Drew Plantation School Department
Eagle Lake School Department
East Machias School Department
East Millinocket School Department
Easton School Department
Eastport School Department
Edgecomb School Department
Ellsworth School Department
Eustis School Department
Falmouth School Department
Fayette School Department
Frenchboro School Department
Georgetown School Department
Gilead School Department
Glenburn School Department
Glenwood Plantation School Department
Gorham School Department
Grand Isle School Department
Grand Lake Stream Plantation School Department
Greenbush School Department
Greenville School Department
Hancock School Department
Harmony School Department
Hermon School Department
Highland Plantation School Department
Hope School Department

I–O

Isle au Haut School Department
Islesboro School Department
Jefferson School Department
Jonesboro School Department
Jonesport School Department
Kingsburg Plantation School Department
Kittery School Department
Lake View Plantation School Department
Lakeville School Department
Lamoine School Department
Lewiston School Department
Limestone School Department
Lincoln Plantation School Department
Lincolnville School Department
Lisbon School Department
Long Island School Department
Lowell School Department
Machias School Department
Machiasport School Department
Macwahoc Plantation School Department
Madawaska School Department
Marshfield School Department
Meddybemps School Department
Medford School Department
Medway School Department
Milford School Department
Millinocket School Department
Minot School Department
Monhegan Plantation School Department
Moro Plantation School Department
Mount Desert School Department
Nashville Plantation School Department
New Sweden School Department
Newcastle School Department
Nobleboro School Department
Northfield School Department
Northport School Department
Orient School Department
Orrington School Department
Otis School Department

P–Z

Pembroke School Department
Penobscot School Department
Perry School Department
Pleasant Ridge Plantation School Department
Portage Lake School Department
Portland School Department
Princeton School Department
Reed Plantation School Department
Robbinston School Department
Rogue Bluff School Department
Saco School Department
Sanford School Department
Scarborough School Department
Sebago School Department
Seboeis Plantation School Department
Sedgwick School Department
Shirley School Department
South Bristol School Department
South Portland School Department
Southport School Department
Southwest Harbor School Department
St. George School Department
Surry School Department
Talmadge School Department
The Forks Plantation School Department
Tremont School Department
Trenton School Department
Upton School Department
Vanceboro School Department
Vassalboro School Department
Veazie School Department
Waite School Department
Waterville School Department
Wesley School Department
West Bath School Department
West Forks Plantation School Department
Westbrook School Department
Westmanland School Department
Whiting School Department
Whitneyville School Department
Willimantic School Department
Winslow School Department
Winterville Plantation School Department
Winthrop School Department
Wiscasset School Department
Woodland School Department
Woodville School Department
Yarmouth School Department
York School Department

School Administrative Districts

School Administrative Districts (S.A.D.s) typically made up of 2 or more municipalities who cooperatively provide education to all of their students.  , 184 cities and towns were served by 52 S.A.D.s, numbered 1 to 76 with numbers 2, 5, 9, 18, 21, 22, 25, 26, 34, 36, 38, 39, 43, 47, 48, 50, 56, 62, 66, 67, 69, 71, and 73 skipped.

Regional School Units

Starting in 2008, smaller school districts around the state were required to combine into Regional School Units (RSUs) or pay a hefty penalty.

Community School Districts

Community School Districts (C.S.D.s) in which 2 or more cities cooperate to provide education to some or sometimes all grade levels.

Airline Community School District – Amherst, Aurora, Great Pond, Osborn
Boothbay-Boothbay Harbor Community School District – Boothbay, Boothbay Harbor
Deer Isle-Stonington Community School District – Deer Isle, Stonington
East Range Community School District – Topsfield
Five Town Community School District – Appleton, Camden, Hope, Lincolnville, Rockport
Great Salt Bay Community School District – Bremen, Damariscotta, Newcastle
Moosabec Community School District – Beals, Jonesport
Mount Desert Community School District – Bar Harbor, Mount Desert, Southwest Harbor, Tremont
Wells-Ogunquit Community School District – Ogunquit, Wells

Unions of Towns
In Unions of Towns, two or more school administrative units share a common superintendent but are otherwise separate.

School Union 60 – Beaver Cove, Greenville
School Union 69 – Appleton, Hope, Lincolnville
School Union 76 – Brooklin, Deer Isle, Sedgwick, Stonington
School Union 93 – Blue Hill, Brooksville, Castine, Penobscot, Surry
School Union 103 – Beals, Jonesport
School Union 122 – New Sweden, Westmanland, Woodland

Indian Schools
The 3 Indian reservation school systems function as a union of towns.

Maine Indian Education – Indian Island, Indian Township, Pleasant Point

Unorganized Territory
In unorganized townships, also known as unorganized territory, schools which are run directly by the state.

Education in the unorganized territory (Maine)

References

External links
Maine Department of Education

Maine
School districts
School districts